The Kinabatangan District is an administrative district in the Malaysian state of Sabah, part of the Sandakan Division which includes the districts of Beluran, Kinabatangan, Sandakan, Telupid and Tongod. The capital of the district is in Kinabatangan Town.

Etymology 
The name Kinabatangan was originally called "Cinabatangan" which means a long river by a Chinese settlement governor in the area named Ong Sum Ping who had arrived to the area in the 16th century. It is believed that the name of Kampung Mumiang, Sukau and Bilit located in the district also comes from the Chinese language.

History 
Kinabatangan was already used by the locals as recorded in the books of French authors in 1782 and 1837, long before the arrival of Chinese immigrants to the area. In addition, Bruneian records record the marriage of Sultan Ahman, Sultan Muhammad's brother, to Princess Kinabatangan, who ruled 1408-1426, also long before the arrival of Chinese immigrants there. The name Kinabatangan is probably from a sentence resulting from the principal name and pronunciation.

The modern district are established during the administration of the North Borneo Chartered Company. At the beginning, the district office is known as the Lamag District Office which established in 1905 by the British colonial authorities whose administrative centre is located in Lamag. The office however only provide services in the affairs of the administration and court. The office later known as Kinabatangan District Office where it is now provide a wider range of services including in district development planning, socio-economics, infrastructure facilities and human capital.

Geography 
The nearby Kinabatangan River is an area along which small fragments of lowland riverine rainforest remain: the Kinabatangan Wildlife Sanctuary. The area is wet and humid and the swampy lowlands are home to particularly high densities of Borneo's more emblematic birds and mammals, such as hornbills, Borneo elephants, and the endemic proboscis monkey. Scattered in the area are limestone outcrops, many with caves that harbour large nesting colonies of echolocating swiftlets, as well as endemic limestone-inhabiting flora and fauna, such as Diplommatinidae snails. The largest and best known of these limestone hills is Gomantong Caves. Kinabatangan also is the large of area under Ramsar site (estuary) with 78,000 hectares both combined rivers that as Kinabatangan and Segama was gazetted in 2008 as 'Kinabatangan-Segama Wetlands Ramsar site'. The recognition is significant, as the wetlands comprise rarely found coastal mangrove swamps and peat jungles.

Demographics 

According to the last census in 2010, the population of the district is estimated to be around 146,987 inhabitants. As in other districts of Sabah, there are a significant number of illegal immigrants from the nearby southern Philippines, mainly from the Sulu Archipelago and Mindanao of whom are not included in the population statistics.

Gallery

See also 
 Districts of Malaysia

References 

<Ruhima Binti Arsah>

Further reading

External links 

  Kinabatangan District Council